The Hyphodermataceae are a family of fungi in the order Polyporales. It contains the genus Hyphoderma.

References 

Polyporales
Hyphodermataceae
Taxa named by Walter Jülich